François-André Vincent (30 December 1746 – 4 August 1816) was a French neoclassical painter.

Biography

Vincent was born in Paris in 1746, the son of the miniaturist François-Elie Vincent. He studied under Joseph-Marie Vien and was a pupil of École Royale des Éleves Protégés. From 1771 to 1775 he studied at the French Academy in Rome. He travelled to Rome after winning the Prix de Rome with Germanicus Calms Sedition in his Camp in 1768, and was when he was installed at the Palais Mancini, where he painted numerous portraits, inspired by Jean-Honoré Fragonard's style, who also was visiting Rome and Naples in the same time.

In 1790, Vincent was appointed master of drawings to Louis XVI of France, and in 1792 he became a professor at the Académie royale de peinture et de sculpture in Paris. In 1800, he married the painter Adélaïde Labille-Guiard who was well known for her mastery in portrait painting, a member of the Royal Academy and painter for the Royal Family.

He was a leader of the neoclassical and historical movement in French art, along with his rival Jacques-Louis David, another pupil of Vien. He was influenced by the art of classical antiquity, by the masters of the Italian High Renaissance, especially Raphael. François-André Vincent was one of the principal innovators of the  subjects and themes in French art of Neoclassical style and his works were of a high standard. He was one of the founder members of the Académie des Beaux-Arts – part of the Institut de France and the successor to the Académie royale – in 1795. Towards the end of his life he painted less due to ill health, but he continued to receive official honours.

Works

See also
 Adélaïde Labille-Guiard
 Portrait of Baron Georges Cuvier (1769–1832), Whitfield Fine Art

References

Further reading
 Book about François-André Vincent's life: The Perfect Foil: FranCois-Andre Vincent and the Revolution in French Painting by Elizabeth C. Mansfield 
 More works

External links

French neoclassical painters
Prix de Rome for painting
Burials at Père Lachaise Cemetery
1746 births
1816 deaths
Members of the Académie des beaux-arts
18th-century French painters
French male painters
19th-century French painters
19th-century French male artists
18th-century French male artists